Ulf Sven Friberg (born 4 October 1962) is a Swedish actor, screenwriter, theatre and film director.

Friberg studied in Malmö 1986–89. After that he was engaged at Stockholm City Theatre. He has also been engaged at the Orion Theatre in Stockholm and Folkteatern in Gothenburg. He has participated in Alla mina söner and Kung Lear at the Royal Dramatic Theatre in Stockholm.

Selected filmography
Hjälten (1990) - Jimmi
Jag skall bli Sveriges Rembrandt eller dö! (1990) - Edvard Casparsson
Kejsarn av Portugallien (1992) - August Olsson
Jönssonligan och den svarta diamanten (1992) - Student
Mannen på balkongen (1993) - Åke Persson
Jerusalem (1996) - Ingmar
Slutspel (1997) - Janne
Syndare i sommarsol (2001) - Möllendorf
Klassfesten (2002) - Tommy
Stora teatern (2002, TV Mini-Series) - Jan
Beck – Pojken i glaskulan (2002, TV Series) - Kaj Gerstedt
Evil (2003) - Tranströmer
Tusenbröder (2003, TV Series) - Lars
En familj (2004) - Tomas
Ring kåta Clarissa (2004)
Kronprinsessan (2006, TV Mini-Series) - Thomas Ekeblad
Exit (2006) - Philip Ceder
Wallander – Hemligheten (2006, TV Series) - Lasse Bengtsson
Upp till kamp (2007, TV Mini-Series) - Jonny Lindman
Främmande fågel (2008-2016, TV Series) - Ek
De halvt dolda (2009, TV Mini-Series) - Erik
Stockholm East (2011) - Nybliven pappa
The Girl with the Dragon Tattoo (2011) - Wennerström
Hamilton: In the Interest of the Nation (2012) - Tomas Gayber
Stockholm Stories (2013) - Lenas make

Screenwriter
Borta Bra (2008)

External links

1962 births
Living people
Swedish male film actors
Swedish film directors
Swedish screenwriters
Swedish male screenwriters
Swedish theatre directors
People from Nässjö Municipality